Hwangsuwon Airport is an airport near Hwangsuwol-li in Kimhyonggwon-gun, Ryanggang-do, North Korea.

Facilities 
The airfield has a single concrete runway 14/32 measuring 9500 x 150 feet (2896 x 46 m).  It is sited in a valley and has a full-length parallel taxiway with two aprons at the ends.  It is also unique in that a taxiway leads nearly 2.8 kilometers to the south-southwest, accessing dispersed aprons.  It is home to a fighter regiment of 44 MiG-21 jets.

References 

Airports in North Korea
Ryanggang